John Becher may refer to:
 John Becher (priest, born 1861) (1861–1946), Anglican archdeacon in Ireland
 John Thomas Becher (1770–1848), English clergyman and social reformer
 John C. Becher (1915–1986), American stage and television actor
 John A. Becher (1833–1915), American businessman and politician